Holborn was a parliamentary constituency centred on the Holborn district of Central London.  It returned one Member of Parliament (MP)  to the House of Commons of the Parliament of the United Kingdom.

The constituency was created for the 1885 general election, and abolished for the 1950 general election, when it was largely replaced by the new constituency of Holborn & St Pancras South.

Boundaries 

The Redistribution of Seats Act 1885 provided that the constituency was to consist of-
so much of the Holborn District as comprises the Parishes of—
St Andrew Holborn Above the Bars with St George the Martyr, and
Saffron Hill, Hatton Garden, Ely Rents and Ely Place.
The St Giles District:
Gray's Inn,
Furnival's Inn,
Staple Inn, and
Lincoln's Inn.

1918–1950: The Metropolitan Borough of Holborn.

Members of Parliament

Elections

Elections in the 1880s

Elections in the 1890s 

Bruce is appointed a judge on the Queen's Bench of the High Court of Justice, causing a by-election.

Elections in the 1900s

Elections in the 1910s 

General Election 1914–15:

Another General Election was required to take place before the end of 1915. The political parties had been making preparations for an election to take place and by the July 1914, the following candidates had been selected; 
Unionist: Sir James Farquharson Remnant
Liberal:

Elections in the 1920s

Elections in the 1930s

Elections in the 1940s

References 

Parliamentary constituencies in London (historic)
Constituencies of the Parliament of the United Kingdom established in 1885
Constituencies of the Parliament of the United Kingdom disestablished in 1950
Politics of the London Borough of Camden